The Alliance Party Guernsey is a political party in Guernsey, and was the first political party to organize in Guernsey.

History

On 12 February 2020, the Alliance Party Guernsey was registered by the Greffe becoming the first political party to organize in Guernsey. The party ran eleven candidates in the 2020 Guernsey general election. None were elected.

Election results

States of Guernsey

References

Political parties established in 2020
Political parties in Guernsey
2020 establishments in Guernsey